The 12 cm 11th Year Type naval gun was a Japanese naval gun and coast defense gun used on submarines, minesweepers, and torpedo boats of the Imperial Japanese Navy during World War II.

Design

The 12 cm 11th Year Type was a 1922 redesign of the earlier 12 cm/45 3rd Year Type naval gun.  The 11th Year Type was a typical built-up gun the period with a central rifled tube surrounded by layers of reinforcing tubes.  There may have also been an autofretted mono-block barreled version of the same gun.  Estimates on the length of the barrel range between 40 and 45 calibers.  The 11th Year Type barrel rested in a ring cradle on a pedestal mount and had a hydro-pneumatic recoil mechanism that consisted of one recoil cylinder below the barrel and two on top.  The 11th Year Type differed from the earlier 3rd Year Type because it had a horizontal sliding-block breech and fired separate loading cased charges and projectiles while the earlier gun fired separate loading bagged charges and projectiles.  The 11th Year Type was used on smaller naval vessels and submarines possibly because a cased charge was easier to load and wasn't as susceptible to water damage on wet decks.  The 11th Year Type had a wider range of elevation and traverse than the 3rd Year Type but with a maximum elevation of +55°, it wasn't really a dual-purpose gun.

Ammunition

Naval use

Weapons of comparable role, performance and era
 BL 4.7 inch /45 naval gun: British equivalent
 5"/51 caliber gun: US Navy equivalent

References & External links

Bibliography
 

Naval guns of Japan
120 mm artillery
Military equipment introduced in the 1920s